Trichoxys is a genus of beetles in the family Cerambycidae, containing the following species:

 Trichoxys abbreviatus Bates, 1880
 Trichoxys apelles (Newman, 1838)
 Trichoxys atripes (Chevrolat, 1860)
 Trichoxys bilineatus (Chevrolat, 1860)
 Trichoxys hirtellus (Chevrolat, 1860)
 Trichoxys labyrinthicus (Chevrolat, 1860)
 Trichoxys longipes Chemsak & Linsley, 1974
 Trichoxys melanotelus (White, 1855)
 Trichoxys ochraetheoides Linsley, 1935
 Trichoxys pellitus (White, 1855)
 Trichoxys rubripes (White, 1855)
 Trichoxys sulphurifer (Chevrolat, 1860)
 Trichoxys viridicollis (Chevrolat, 1860)
 Trichoxys vitticollis (Laporte & Gory, 1835)
 Trichoxys westwoodii (Chevrolat, 1860)

References

Clytini